Rickey Nelson Cradle (born June 20, 1973) is a former Major League Baseball player. Cradle played in five games for the Seattle Mariners in the  season. He had one hit in seven at-bats, with two RBI. He also had one walk and one stolen base. He was drafted by the Toronto Blue Jays in the 5th round of the 1991 Major League Baseball Draft.

External links

1973 births
Living people
Baseball players from Norfolk, Virginia
Major League Baseball outfielders
Seattle Mariners players
Medicine Hat Blue Jays players
Hagerstown Suns players
Dunedin Blue Jays players
Knoxville Smokies players
Syracuse Chiefs players
Syracuse SkyChiefs players
Tacoma Rainiers players
Toledo Mud Hens players
African-American baseball players